The 1994 European Parliament election for the election of the delegation from the Netherlands was held on 9 June 1994. This is the 4th time the elections have been held for the European elections in the Netherlands.

Sources for everything below:

Numbering of the candidates list 
The official order and names of candidate lists:

| colspan="6" | 
|-
! style="background-color:#E9E9E9;text-align:center;vertical-align:top;" colspan=5 | Lists
|-
!style="background-color:#E9E9E9;text-align:center;" colspan="3"|List
!style="background-color:#E9E9E9;| English translation
!style="background-color:#E9E9E9;| List name (Dutch)
|-
| 1
| 
| style="text-align:left;" | list
| style="text-align:left;" | CDA - European People's Party
| style="text-align:left;" | CDA – Europese Volkspartij

|-
| 2
| 
| style="text-align:left;" | list
| style="text-align:left;" | P.v.d.A./European Social Democrats
| style="text-align:left;" | P.v.d.A./Europese Sociaaldemocraten

|-
| 3
| 
| style="text-align:left;" | list
| style="text-align:left;" | VVD/European Liberal-Democrats
| style="text-align:left;" | VVD/Europese Liberaal-Democraten

|-
| 4
| 
| style="text-align:left;" | list
| style="text-align:left;" colspan="2" | D66

|-
| 5
| 
| style="text-align:left;" | list
| style="text-align:left;" | SGP, GPV and RPF
| style="text-align:left;" | SGP, GPV en RPF

|-
| 6
| 
| style="text-align:left;" | list
| style="text-align:left;" | A Better Future...
| style="text-align:left;" | Een Betere Toekomst...

|-
| 7
| 
| style="text-align:left;" | list
| style="text-align:left;" | SP (Socialist Party)
| style="text-align:left;" | SP (Socialistische Partij)

|-
| 8
| 
| style="text-align:left;" | list
| style="text-align:left;" | The Greens
| style="text-align:left;" | De Groenen

|-
| 9
| 
| style="text-align:left;" | list
| style="text-align:left;" | List De Groen
| style="text-align:left;" | Lijst De Groen

|-
| 10
| 
| style="text-align:left;" | list
| style="text-align:left;" colspan="2" | CD

|-
| 11
| 
| style="text-align:left;" | list
| style="text-align:left;" | GREENLEFT
| style="text-align:left;" | GROENLINKS

|-
|}

Candidate lists

CDA - European People's Party 

Below is the candidate list for the Christian Democratic Appeal for the 1994 European Parliament election

Elected members are in bold

P.v.d.A./European Social Democrats 

Below is the candidate list for the Labour Party for the 1994 European Parliament election

Elected members are in bold

VVD/European Liberal-Democrats 

Below is the candidate list for the People's Party for Freedom and Democracy for the 1994 European Parliament election

Elected members are in bold

D66 

Below is the candidate list for the Democrats 66 for the 1994 European Parliament election

Elected members are in bold

SGP, GPV and RPF 

Below is the candidate list for SGP, GPV and RPF for the 1994 European Parliament election

Elected members are in bold

A Better Future... 
Below is the candidate list for A Better Future... for the 1994 European Parliament election

SP (Socialist Party) 

Below is the candidate list for Socialist Party for the 1994 European Parliament election

The Greens 

Below is the candidate list for The Greens for the 1994 European Parliament election

List De Groen 
Below is the candidate list for List De Groen for the 1994 European Parliament election

CD 

Below is the candidate list for the Centre Democrat for the 1994 European Parliament election

GreenLeft 

Below is the candidate list for GreenLeft for the 1994 European Parliament election

Elected members are in bold

References

1994
Netherlands